Deestone is a Thai multinational tire manufacturer based in Om Noi, Samut Sakhon in the central of Thailand. It is the country’s largest Thai-owned tyres production facility.  The company running five plants and subsidiaries in Samut Sakhon and Nakhon Pathom. In 2015, Deestone had the total of investment around 10 billions baht with production capacity for radial tyres for more than 10 million units. Deestone has 10,000 employees and 600 dealers nationwide and exporting for more than 120 countries worldwide.
Deestone has numerous of products such as, Motorcycle tyres, Truck tyres, Bicycle tyres, Agricultural tyres, Radial tyres etc.

History 

Deestone was established by Suvit Vongsariyavanich in 1977. The first and second factory are called Deestone Co., Ltd and Deerubber Co., Ltd as following. Those factories producing truck tyres, Industrial tyres and motorcycle tyres. 

In 1994, with the establishment of third factory, Deestone International Co., Ltd. The company diversified into bicycle, scooter and special industrial tyres and inner tube manufacturing for export.

Deestone announced the first radial tyres factory called, Svizz-One Corporation Co., Ltd (Fourth Factory) in 2007. With the fourth plant, it leads to support both domestic and international radial markets.

In 2014, Deestone commenced operation of its fifth plant called Siam Truck Radial Co., Ltd, making truck radial tyres in Kamphaeng Saen, Nakhon Pathom.

Products 

 Motorcycle Tyres
 Bicycle Tyres
 Commercial vehicle Tyres (Radial) 
 Truck bias Tyres
 Agricultural Tyres 
 Radial Tyres
 Forklift Tyres 
 OTR Tyres
 Tube and Flaps

Brands 
 1. Deestone
 2. Thunderer

Sponsorship
In 2016, Deestone was the sponsorship of Thai League 1 club, Nakhon Ratchasima F.C. and Thai League 2 club, Nakhon Pathom United F.C.

Promotion partner

In 2015 and 2017, Deestone was the promotion partner of Furious 7 and Furious 8 , the seventh and eighth installment in The Fast and the Furious franchise as following.

List of Deestone Factories 
 1. Deestone Co., Ltd
 2. Deerubber Co., Ltd
 3. Deestone International Co., Ltd
 4. Svizz-one Corporation Co., Ltd
 5. Siam Truck Radial Co., Ltd

See also
 List of companies of Thailand
 List of tire companies

References

External links 
 
Официальный сайт в Украине
Tire manufacturers of Thailand
Thai brands